Tapio Räisänen (born May 10, 1949) is a Finnish former ski jumper who competed in the late 1970s. He was born in Taivalkoski.

Räisänen won a gold medal in the individual large hill competition at the 1978 FIS Nordic World Ski Championships in Lahti and finished 6th in the normal hill at those same championships.
Ski flying-WM 1977 in Vikersund 7th.

Räisänen's best non-world championship career finish was 9th in a normal hill event at Bischofshofen, Austria in 1979, and 1st in Japan, Sapporo large hill 1980.

In 2012, the Finnish Minister for Education and the Ministry of Culture created the Tapio Räisänen Pro Sports Recognition Award worth 20,000 euros.

External links

1949 births
Living people
People from Taivalkoski
Finnish male ski jumpers
FIS Nordic World Ski Championships medalists in ski jumping
Sportspeople from North Ostrobothnia
20th-century Finnish people